KVIK Hockey Arena is a hockey arena in Herning, Denmark. It is used by Herning Blue Fox. The complex consists of two rinks, KVIK Hockey Arena that has a capacity of 4120, where 420 of them are seats and the old arena that has a capacity of 200.

Renovation 

It was decided in June 2016 that the 30 year old arena wasn't good enough as a training facility for the 2018 IIHF World Championship which is set in Herning and Copenhagen, Denmark. The arena will be fully rebuilt and renovated for 61 million DKK for the championship.

Indoor ice hockey venues in Denmark
Herning
1987 establishments in Denmark
Sports venues completed in 1987